Hakeem Amir Nicks (born January 14, 1988) is a former American football wide receiver. He played college football at North Carolina, and was drafted by the New York Giants in the first round of the 2009 NFL Draft. Nicks has also played for the Indianapolis Colts.

Personal life
Nicks was born in Charlotte, North Carolina. He attended Independence High School (Charlotte, North Carolina). Playing football there, he was rated as one of the Top 10 Players in North Carolina by SuperPrep and Rivals.com. He was also named the Charlotte Observer Offensive Player of the Year and was also selected to the North Carolina Associated Press All-State team. He never lost a game in high school, and completed his senior year with MVP honors at the 4-AA state championship game. In the game, he posted eight catches for 205 yards and two touchdowns (one for 11 and another for 80 yards). He posted 93 catches for 1,819 yards and 20 touchdowns in his senior year.

Hakeem Nicks is the son of Rob Nicks, Jr. and Lisa Mason. He has two brothers, Anwar and Aleef, and a daughter named Harmony.

On August 24, 2022, Nicks auctioned off his Super Bowl XLVI ring. On August 28, 2022, the ring sold for $117,000 and plans on donating some of that money to charity.

College career
During his freshman season, Nicks started all 11 games in which he played, missing one game due to an ankle sprain. Nicks led the team and set school single-season records for receptions and receiving yards by a freshman. He ranked third in the ACC in receiving yards per game and eighth in receptions per game.

Nicks improved dramatically in his sophomore season, setting a single-season school record with 74 catches for 958 receiving yards along with five touchdowns. His single-season receiving yards were the third most in school history.  Nicks finished second in the ACC with 79.8 receiving yards per game and third with 6.17 catches per game. Has made at least one catch in 22 of 23 games played and caught at least two passes in each game his sophomore season.

Nicks was honored as a First-team All-ACC selection at wide receiver. By the completion of his junior season, Nicks set 14 school records at UNC, including career receptions (181), career receiving yards (2,580), and career touchdowns (21). During his last season, Nicks tallied 68 catches for school records of 1,222 yards and 12 touchdowns. The 68 receptions tied for third most in a season in school history.  Nicks led the ACC and ranked 12th nationally with 94.0 receiving yards per game.  Nicks caught at least one pass in 26 straight games and had a catch in 35 of 36 career games.  He set the UNC single-season receiving yardage record and became North Carolina's first 1,000-yard receiver.

Nicks ended his collegiate career in the 2008 Meineke Car Care Bowl, where he caught eight passes for a bowl record of 217 yards, with three going for touchdowns of 73, 66 and 25 yards, in a game against West Virginia.  One of his other catches in that game was offered a candidate for the "Greatest Catch of the Year."

Four years after he had left North Carolina, Nicks was found guilty of academic fraud during the 2008 school year. His record setting season will remain in the media guide, but the school said they will place an asterisk by his records. Nicks was found to have received some jewelry and money during his years at North Carolina.

College statistics summary

* school record
** vacated from school record books

Professional career

2009 NFL Draft
Considered to be one of the top wide receivers available in the 2009 NFL Draft, Nicks drew comparisons to Hines Ward and Anquan Boldin. Butch Davis, Nicks' coach at North Carolina, went even further, comparing him to Hall of Famer Michael Irvin. The New York Giants, in need to replace wide-out Plaxico Burress, selected Nicks in the first round, 29th overall. Nicks was the fifth wide receiver taken in the draft, and one out of six taken in the first round alone.

New York Giants

On August 1, 2009, Nicks signed a five-year, $12.54 million contract. The deal includes a $6.5 million signing bonus. During training camp, Nicks vied for a starting position with the Giants' other wide receivers, most notably Domenik Hixon and Steve Smith, and Hakeem Nicks had the best overall average of all these wide receivers with a 16.0 average.

Nicks made his first career NFL reception on September 13, 2009 against the Washington Redskins on wide receiver screen pass for 11 yards. On October 4, 2009 against the Kansas City Chiefs, Nicks recorded his first touchdown reception on a 54-yard screen pass. However, Odell Beckham Jr. broke that record. On the strength of that feat, Nicks was named the NFL Offensive Rookie of the Month. Nicks ended the season starting in the #2 wide receiver spot opposite Steve Smith after an injury to Domenik Hixon in Week 2 and outperforming Mario Manningham as of Week 14.

At the start of the 2010 season, Nicks recorded his first three-touchdown game against the Carolina Panthers during the season opener, catching a total of 4 passes for 75 yards in a winning effort. During week five, when New York visited Houston, Nicks exploited the NFL's 29th ranked secondary and more specifically Texans rookie cornerback Kareem Jackson as he reeled in career highs with 12 catches (tying a franchise record) for 130 yards. In addition, Nicks caught two touchdown passes on the day from quarterback Eli Manning. Nicks was inactive for the final game of the season in Washington due to a broken toe in his left foot. On the year, he recorded 1,052 yards on 79 receptions, and was fourth in the NFL with 11 receiving touchdowns.

Nicks opened the 2011 season, his third, with seven receptions for 122 yards in a loss to Washington, followed three weeks later with 10 receptions for a career-best 162 yards and a touchdown against Arizona in the Giants' third-straight win. Nicks remained one of the few bright spots in the Giants' subsequent 2-5 slump, averaging 73 yards per game and recording four touchdowns. In Game 13 at Dallas, Nicks again had a career-best 163 yards on ten receptions in a pivotal 37–34 win. In the 2011 season, Nicks had his second straight 1,000+ yard receiving season. He caught 76 passes for 1,192 yards (15.7 yards per catch average) and seven touchdowns, helping the Giants sneak into the playoffs at 9–7.

In the Giants' historically improbable 2011 postseason, Nicks had the most prolific receiving statistics in franchise history. In the Wild Card Round against the Atlanta Falcons, Nicks recorded six receptions for 115 yards and two touchdowns in the 24–2 victory. The following week against the top seeded 15-1 Green Bay Packers, Nicks hauled in seven catches for 165 yards and two more touchdowns, including a 37-yard Hail Mary reception at the end of the first half. After 55 yards in the championship win over San Francisco, in Super Bowl XLVI against the New England Patriots Nicks was the leading receiver for the game with 10 receptions for 109 yards to help secure a 21-17 New York Giants victory. , Nicks' 2011 postseason numbers remain franchise records with 28 receptions for 444 yards (also most all-purpose yards) and 4 receiving touchdowns (also tied with Joe Morris and Brandon Jacobs for most total touchdowns). He also holds postseason career franchise records for most Yds/Rec with 15.86, Yds/Game with 111, most 100+ yard receiving games with 3, and along with Amani Toomer is the only Giant with 2 games with 2+ TD scored.

In the 2013 season, Nicks did not record a touchdown reception, but still finished with 896 receiving yards in 15 games played for the Giants. Nearing the trade deadline on October 29, there was speculation that the New York Giants were going to trade him. As the deadline passed, no deal was done and Nicks remained a Giant until his contract expired at the conclusion of the season, making him a free agent.

Indianapolis Colts
On March 14, 2014, Nicks signed a one-year deal worth a maximum of $5.5 million with the Indianapolis Colts. In the Colts' Week 17 game against the Tennessee Titans, Nicks had three receptions for 46 yards, taking him over 5,000 receiving yards for his career. He finished the season with 38 receptions, 408 yards, and four touchdowns.

Tennessee Titans
On April 24, 2015, Nicks signed a 1-year deal with the Tennessee Titans.

Nicks was released by the Titans on September 5, 2015.

Second stint with Giants
On November 17, 2015, Nicks returned to the Giants, signing a one-year deal.

New Orleans Saints
Nicks signed a one-year contract with the New Orleans Saints on July 27, 2016. On August 8, 2016, the Saints waived Nicks.

XFL
Nicks participated in a tryout for the XFL in June 2019.

NFL career statistics

Regular season

Postseason

Awards and accomplishments

 Super Bowl Champion (XLVI)
 NFC Champion (2011)
 NFL Alumni Wide Receiver of the Year (2011)
 Ranked #90 in the Top 100 Players of 2012
 NFL Offensive Rookie of the Month (October 2009)
 Most career receptions in UNC history (181) * Ryan Switzer Broke this
 Most career TD receptions in UNC history (21)
 Most single-season TD receptions in UNC history (12)
 2007 First-team All-ACC by Rivals.com
 2007 Second-team All-ACC by The Associated Press
 2008 First-team All-ACC by ACSMA/AP
 Honorary Sound Board Laugh by ESPN Radio (Dan Le Batard)

References

External links

Indianapolis Colts bio
North Carolina Tar Heels bio

1988 births
Living people
African-American players of American football
American football wide receivers
Indianapolis Colts players
New York Giants players
Tennessee Titans players
New Orleans Saints players
North Carolina Tar Heels football players
Players of American football from Charlotte, North Carolina
21st-century African-American sportspeople
20th-century African-American people